Mechthildis Thein (1888 in Braunschweig – 1959 in Singen) was a German stage and film actress of the silent period.

Selected filmography
 Fear (1917)
 The Rat (1918)
 The Salamander Ruby (1918)
 Henriette Jacoby (1918)
 Countess Walewska (1920)
 Catherine the Great (1920)

External links

1888 births
1959 deaths
German stage actresses
German film actresses
German silent film actresses
20th-century German actresses
Actors from Braunschweig